The Trump travel ban denotes a series of executive actions taken by Donald Trump as President of the United States, beginning with Protecting the Nation from Foreign Terrorist Entry into the United States (January 27, 2017).

It was labeled the "Muslim ban" by critics. On January 20, 2021, newly-inaugurated president Joe Biden issued a proclamation revoking the Trump travel bans.

Comments during 2016 presidential campaign 
On December 7, 2015, as a candidate for president, Donald Trump called for "a total and complete shutdown of Muslims entering the United States until our country's representatives can figure out what the hell is going on." His comments were condemned by several of his competitors for the Republican nomination, including Chris Christie, Jeb Bush, Marco Rubio, and Lindsey Graham, as well as by several Republican state party chairmen, civil rights activist Ibrahim Hooper of the Council on American-Islamic Relations (CAIR), and Democratic candidates for president Bernie Sanders and Martin O'Malley.

Executive actions 
 Executive Order 13769, Protecting the Nation from Foreign Terrorist Entry into the United States (January 27, 2017) – The original travel ban. Travel ban for people from seven majority-Muslim countries (Iran, Iraq, Libya, Somalia, Sudan, Syria, and Yemen) for 90 days, with certain exceptions. 
 Also suspended refugee resettlement for 120 days and banned Syrian refugees indefinitely. Lowered cap for refugee admissions for fiscal year 2017 from 110,000 to 50,000.
 Blocked by Washington v. Trump on Feb. 3, 2017. Trump declined to continue to defend in court.
 Executive Order 13780 (March 6, 2017) – The second and revised travel ban rescinding the original travel ban. Travel ban for people from six majority-Muslim countries (same as above, minus Iraq) for 90 days.
 This ban exempted those who already have visas and green cards.
 Also suspended refugee resettlement for 120 days. Lowered cap for refugee admissions for fiscal year 2017 from 110,000 to 50,000.
 Presidential Proclamation 9645 (September 24, 2017) – A third travel ban that replaced the second one. Travel ban for certain nationals of Venezuela, North Korea, and six majority-Muslim countries (five of the countries above, removing Sudan, and adding Chad).
 Executive Order 13815 (October 24, 2017) – Suspended processing and admissions of refugees from North Korea, South Sudan and nine majority-Muslim countries (Egypt, Iran, Iraq, Libya, Mali, Somalia, Sudan, Syria, and Yemen) for at least 90 days while agencies "conducted a review and analysis"
 Also suspended processing and admissions of family members entering through the follow-to-join process, while agencies added security procedures.
 After the 90 day review process, the Department of Homeland Security issued a press release that all refugee processing would resume, but additional security measures would be applied to certain countries.
 Presidential Proclamation 9723 (April 10, 2018) – A proclamation removed the travel restrictions on Chad.
 Presidential Proclamation 9983 (January 31, 2020) – An expansion of Presidential Proclamation 9645 to additional countries.
 Prohibited certain types of immigrant visa entries by certain nationals who did not already have a valid visa.

Court Challenges 

 Executive Order 13769
 Darweesh v. Trump (NY): filed on behalf of two Iraqi IRAP clients who were detained at JFK airport and threatened with deportation because the executive order was issued while they were traveling to the US.
 In response, the court blocked deportations under the executive order, leading to the release of approximately 2,000 people. The government agreed to reach out to everyone who was denied entry or deported under the Executive Order and who had not yet reapplied for a visa or returned to the US to inform them of their right to reapply for a visa.
 Two days later, a federal judge in New York granted the Darweesh plaintiffs' request for a nationwide temporary injunction blocking the deportation of all people stranded in US airports under Trump's new Muslim ban. Four other courts also weighed in, favoring the Darweesh court ruling.
 Washington v. Trump (Washington District Court - February 3, 2017): blocked the executive order within a week of it going into effect. Trump abandoned his effort to defend.
 Does v. Trump (Washington District Court - February 7 2017): class action lawsuit challenging the first executive order.
 IRAP v. Trump (Maryland District Court - February 7, 2017): sued Trump on behalf of organizations, charging that the ban violates the First Amendment's prohibition of government establishment of religion and the Fifth Amendment's guarantees of equal treatment under the law.
 Executive Order 13780
 Hawaii v. Trump (Hawaii District Court - March 15, 2017): blocked the second executive order travel ban and refugee ban before they took effect on constitutional grounds. The 9th Circuit affirmed the decision on statutory grounds. 
 The Supreme Court allowed the government to implement the travel ban and refugee ban, except with respect to those with "bona fide relationships." Subsequently, the Supreme Court left in place a lower court order defining "bona fide relationships" to include grandparents, grandchildren, brothers-in-law, sisters-in-law, aunts, uncles, nieces, nephews and cousins.
 The Supreme Court also issued an order that allowed refugees with formal assurances from resettlement organizations to be banned unless they have other ties to people or entities in the United States, pending further proceedings.
 IRAP v. Trump (Maryland District Court - March 16, 2017): blocked the second executive order's travel ban before it took effect on constitutional grounds. The Fourth Circuit affirmed on constitutional grounds. The Supreme Court limited the Hawaii and IRAP decisions to people with a "bona fide relationship" to a US person or entity, while the legal challenges continued.
 Presidential Proclamation 9645 
 Hawaii v. Trump (Hawaii District Court - October 17, 2017): blocked the third executive order, excluding the nationals of Venezuela and North Korea, based on the likelihood of success on statutory claims.
 The Ninth Circuit affirmed on appeal, but limited the injunction to people with "bona fide relationships".
 The Supreme Court let the ban go into effect while it reviewed the decision. The Supreme Court upheld the administration's ban.
 IRAP v. Trump (Maryland District Court - October 17, 2017): also blocked the third executive order, excluding the nationals of Venezuela and North Korea and those who lacked a "bona fide relationship".
 Executive Order 13815
 Doe v. Trump / Jewish Family Services v. Trump (consolidated cases - Washington District Court - December 23, 2017): blocked the fourth executive order relating to refugee admissions with respect to all follow-to-join beneficiaries and all refugees from the targeted countries, who have a "bona fide relationship" to a person or entity in the United States.
 Doe is a refugee living in Washington who wanted to be reunited with his wife and children.
 The government agreed to prioritize the processing of 315 refugee cases whose applications were still pending because of the suspension and to count any resulting admissions under fiscal year 2018 numbers.

List of Countries under Travel Ban 
The countries affected by the travel ban: All travel restrictions listed below were ended by President Biden on January 20, 2021.

 – The third travel ban (September 24, 2017) prohibited entry for nationals. Ban was removed in the revision to the ban on April 10, 2018. 
 – The fourth ban (February 21, 2020) restricted travel from immigrants but not on non-immigrants. Suspended issuance of new immigrant visas that could lead to permanent residency. Did not ban non-immigrant visa entries.
 – In the first ban (January 27, 2017), entry was prohibited for 90 days for all nationals. The second ban on March 6, 2017 replaced the first ban and prohibited entry for 90 days. The third ban on September 24, 2017 suspended issuance of new immigrant visas and non-immigrant visas except F, M, and J visas (student and exchange visitor visas).
 – In the first ban (January 27, 2017), entry was prohibited for 90 days for all nationals. The prohibition was removed in the second ban (March 6, 2017).
 – The fourth ban (February 21, 2020) restricted travel from immigrants but not for non-immigrants. Suspended issuance new immigrant visas that could lead to permanent residency.
 – In the first ban (January 27, 2017), entry was prohibited for 90 days for all nationals. The second ban on March 6, 2017 replaced the first ban and prohibited entry for 90 days. The third ban (September 24, 2017) suspended entry for immigrants and individuals on B-1, B-2 and B-1/B-2 visas (business, tourist and business/tourist visas).
 – The fourth ban (February 21, 2020) restricted travel from immigrants but not for non-immigrants. Suspended issuance of new immigrant visas that could lead to permanent residency.
 – The fourth ban (February 21, 2020) restricted travel from immigrants but not for non-immigrants. Suspended issuance of new immigrant visas that could lead to permanent residency.
 – The third ban (September 24, 2017) suspended entry for all non-immigrant visa entries.
 – In the first ban (January 27, 2017), entry was prohibited for 90 days for all nationals. The second ban on March 6, 2017 replaced the first ban and prohibited entry for 90 days. The third ban (September 24, 2017) suspended entry for immigrants, but not for any non-immigrant visa entries.
 – In the first ban (January 27, 2017), entry was prohibited for 90 days for all nationals. The second ban on March 6, 2017 replaced the first ban and prohibited entry for 90 days. This country was not affected by the third ban. The fourth ban (February 21, 2020) suspended issuance of new diversity lottery visas. Did not ban non-immigrant visa entries.
 – In the first ban (January 27, 2017), entry was prohibited for 90 days for all nationals. The second ban on March 6, 2017 replaced the first ban and prohibited entry for 90 days. the third ban (September 24, 2017) suspended entry for immigrants and non-immigrants.
 – The fourth ban (February 21, 2020) suspended issuance of new diversity lottery visas. Did not ban non-immigrant visa entries.
 – The third ban (September 24, 2017) suspended entry for officials of Venezuelan government agencies who are involved in screening and vetting procedures as nonimmigrants on B-1, B-2, and B-1/B-2 visas (business, tourist, and business/tourist visas), as well as the families of those government officials.
 – In the first ban (January 27, 2017), entry was prohibited for 90 days for all nationals. The second ban on March 6, 2017 replaced the first ban and prohibited entry for 90 days. The third ban (September 24, 2017) suspended entry for immigrants and nonimmigrants on B-1, B-2, and B-1/B-2 visas (business, tourist, and business/tourist visas).

Waivers 
Presidential Proclamation 9645 provided for 'waivers' as exceptions to people affected from the countries who need visas. The waivers were supposed to be granted at the discretion of the consular officers who review the applications of those facing a lot of undue hardship that requires them to be with their loved ones in the United States. For example, if a family member in the United States is dying, a person from the country with a travel ban on it would be granted a waiver to see their family member one last time. However, only 2% of the people who applied for the waiver were granted one. From 33,176 applicants through April 30, 2018, 579 applicants had been granted the waiver.

Polling

See also
 Muslim immigration ban

References

2017 establishments in the United States
2021 disestablishments in the United States
Executive Order 13769
Executive orders of Donald Trump
Trump administration controversies
Anti-immigration politics in the United States
Immigration to the United States
Immigration policy of Donald Trump
Islam-related controversies in North America
Islamophobia in the United States
Chad–United States relations
Kyrgyzstan–United States relations
Eritrea–United States relations
Iran–United States relations
Iraq–United States relations
Libya–United States relations
Myanmar–United States relations
Nigeria–United States relations
North Korea–United States relations
Somalia–United States relations
Sudan–United States relations
Syria–United States relations
Tanzania–United States relations
United States–Yemen relations
United States–Venezuela relations